South Africa women's junior national softball team is the junior national under-19 team for South Africa administered by Softball South Africa. The team competed at the 2007 ISF Junior Women's World Championship in Enschede, Netherlands where they finished fifteenth.  The team competed at the 2011 ISF Junior Women's World Championship in Cape Town, South Africa where they finished thirteenth.

References

External links 
 International Softball Federation

Women's national under-18 softball teams
Softball in South Africa
Softball